The Almighty Latin Eagles Nation (ALEN) originated in the area of Halsted and Addison in Chicago in the 1960s. Originally meant to be a Latino political organization, by the 1970s it had transformed into a criminal street gang.

Identification

Members of the Latin Eagles Nation identify themselves with the colors grey and black. They also use the symbols such as an eagle head or an eagle in flight. They also use the symbols for and are associated with the Folk Nation.

History
In 1960 two Latin American immigrants, "Pops" and "Cha-cha Jimenez" started a community organization in Chicago's north-west side for Hispanics who wanted to fight against "a corrupt system, racism, and segregation". This eventually became the Latin Eagles.

A war involving the Latin Eagles and the Gangster Disciples started in the summer of 1995.

References

Organizations established in the 1960s
1960s establishments in Illinois
Folk Nation
Gangs in Chicago
Hispanic-American gangs
Latino street gangs
Puerto Rican culture in Chicago